Abbas Ibrahim  (born 2 January 1998) is a Nigerian professional footballer who plays as a midfielder for Azerbaijani club Zira.

Professional career
Ibrahim made his professional debut for Paços de Ferreira in a 2-0 Taça da Liga loss to S.L. Benfica on 4 December 2018.

On 4 February 2023, Ibrahim signed a two-and-a-half-year contract with Zira in Azerbaijan.

References

External links
 
 ZeroZero profile

1998 births
People from Kogi State
Living people
Nigerian footballers
Association football forwards
F.C. Paços de Ferreira players
U.S.C. Paredes players
F.C. Arouca players
Zira FK players
Campeonato de Portugal (league) players
Primeira Liga players
Nigerian expatriate footballers
Expatriate footballers in Portugal
Nigerian expatriate sportspeople in Portugal
Expatriate footballers in Azerbaijan
Nigerian expatriate sportspeople in Azerbaijan